Datrana or Dantrana is a village in Mendarada Taluka of Junagadh district, Gujarat, India. Historicaly, Datrana was the jagir consisting of 84 villages ruled by the Charanas. The village is well-known for the shrine of goddess Aai Nagbai.

History
During British Raj, Datrana belonged to the Vadal revenue subdivision of the Junagadh state. It is twelve miles south of Junagadh and twenty miles south of Vadál.

Legend of Ra Mandalika and Nagbai
It is famous as being the birthplace of the Cháran woman Nágbái who cursed Ra Mandalika III, the last Rajput sovereign of Junágadh when he insulted her modesty. Her father's name was Harjog Dámo. He had no issue but finally after much serving of holy men he obtained one daughter Nágbái through the intercession of an ascetic named Hirágar. Harjog resided at Dhamphulia about six miles south west of Junágadh. Nāgbái was married to Cháran Ravsur Bhásur Her descendants are still to be found at Dántrána and are called Gorviála Chárans. There is a shrine and memorial stone of Nágbái at Dántrána. It is said that Mandalika was enamoured of her son Nágájan's wife Minbāi. When any great man visits a Cháran's village, it is the custom of the Cháran women to approach him face to face with a tray containing kanku or redpowder moistened with water and some raw rice. They then make the Tilak on his forehead with the kanku and affix some rice to it they then throw some of the grain or some flowers over him and bless him and depart after cracking their fingers against their temples. This last is emblematic of the person so doing taking misfortunes of the person in whose honour this is done upon her. When Minbāi approached Mandalika to perform this ceremony turned away from her in another direction because he was unwilling to accept her blessing as his doing so would make her sacred from his unlawful desires On his thus turning away Minbāi said to Nágbái, "The Ra turns away". Nágbái said, "Try him in another direction as perhaps there may be some bad omen to him in receiving a blessing in that direction." She went in all four directions but the Ra still turned away from her. She then said to Nágbái, "I have tried all four directions but he still turns away". Nágbái replied, "You need not try any more it is not Mandalika who turns but the days of his good fortune which have turned away from him." Then was going away when Mandalika placed his hand on bosom Minbāi ran screaming to her mother-in-law and complained of the insult the Ra had put on her. Nágbái then cursed him as follows:

Places of interest
About half a mile north of the village is the Godhmo Hill so named because fabled to have once been the residence of a demon of this name. There are small shrines of the goddesses Gátrád and Khodiyar on the summit of this hill much respected by Kathis and Charanas. The hill is composed of a kind of syenite and is covered with Ráyan trees (Mimusops hexandrus) and it is said that if the berries of this tree are taken away for private consumption they keep good, but if taken away for sale maggots at once appear in them.

Demographics
The population of Dántrána according to the census of 1872 was 1421 but sank to 1273 souls in 1881 consequent on the famine of 1878-79.

Notable people 

 Putlibai Gandhi - mother of Mahatma Gandhi

References

Villages in Junagadh district
Charan